Mollinedia glabra is a species of plant in the Monimiaceae family. It is endemic to Brazil.  It is threatened by habitat loss.

References

glabra
Endemic flora of Brazil
Flora of Espírito Santo
Flora of Rio de Janeiro (state)
Vulnerable flora of South America
Taxonomy articles created by Polbot